The Tomb of the Cybermen is the first serial of the fifth season of the British science fiction television series Doctor Who, which was originally broadcast in four weekly parts on BBC1 from 2 to 23 September 1967.

In the serial, the time traveller the Second Doctor (Patrick Troughton) and his travelling companions Jamie McCrimmon (Frazer Hines) and Victoria Waterfield (Deborah Watling) get caught up in an expedition to the planet Telos. The financiers of the expedition, Eric Klieg (George Pastell) and Kaftan (Shirley Cooklin), intend to revitalise the Cybermen that are buried on Telos in underground tombs, hoping they will share their power.

The Tomb of the Cybermen is the earliest serial known to exist in its entirety starring Troughton as the Second Doctor. It is also the only known complete Cyberman story produced in the 1960s, and introduces the concepts of the Cyber Controller and the Cybermats, both of which would be re-used in later Cyberman stories.

Plot

On the planet Telos, an archeological expedition uncovers a hidden entrance in a mountainside. When one of the members tries to open the doors, he is electrocuted. The TARDIS lands nearby and the expedition is met by the Second Doctor, Jamie, and Victoria. Parry, the expedition's leader, explains that they are here to find the remains of the Cybermen, who died out five centuries before. The expedition is funded by Kaftan, who is accompanied by Toberman and her colleague Klieg. Deciding to accompany them, the Doctor helps open the doors and, while he, Parry, and Klieg stay to open the hatch leading to the tombs, the others explore the building.

Victoria, Kaftan, and Viner, Parry's assistant, discover a chamber with a sarcophagus-like wall inset facing a projector that was used to revitalise the Cybermen. After Victoria is locked inside, the Doctor is called to help her escape, though he suspects Kaftan is to blame. Meanwhile, Jamie and Haydon, another member of the expedition, experiment with the control panel in another room. A Cyberman emerges and a gun fires, killing Haydon. The Doctor investigates and deduces that the room is a testing range for weapons; the Cyberman being a dummy to be used for such purposes. With two members dead, Parry decides to call off the expedition, only to be informed by pilot Captain Hopper that someone has sabotaged the rocket ship, meaning they are stranded until repairs are completed. Klieg opens the hatch and the team descend, leaving Kaftan and Victoria behind.

They find a vast chamber beneath with a multistorey structure, containing a small army of frozen Cybermen. Back in the control room, Kaftan drugs Victoria and reseals the hatch. Klieg revives the Cybermen betraying the group, killing Viner when he tries to stop the process. As the Cybermen emerge, Klieg reveals that he and Kaftan belong to the Brotherhood of Logicians, a cult with great intelligence but no physical power. He believes the Cybermen will be grateful for their revival and will ally themselves with the Brotherhood to conquer the universe. After they awaken, the Cybermen revive their leader, the Cyber-Controller, and take the group as prisoners. The Doctor realizes that the tombs are actually an elaborate trap, with the Cybermen keeping themselves frozen until they were revived and rebuild their invasion force to conquer Earth.

When Victoria awakens, she confronts Kaftan, who holds her at gunpoint to prevent her from interfering. However, she is attacked and rendered unconscious by a Cybermat, which Victoria destroys. Retrieving Hopper and co-pilot Callum, who have stayed to repair the rocket, they open the hatch to mount a rescue, using smoke grenades to distract the Cybermen. Though they are able to rescue most of the party, Toberman is recaptured and taken to be converted. Disarming and placing Klieg and Kaftan in the weapon testing room while they wait for the rocket to be repaired, the group is attacked by a swarm of Cybermats, which the Doctor incapacitates with electrical currents. After repairing a cybergun on the dummy, the Logicians return and open the hatch, believing that they can still forge their alliance with the Cybermen.

With their energy levels running low, the Cybermen return to their tombs whilst the Cyber-Controller and a partially converted Toberman meet with the group. Taking him to the revitalizing chamber, the Doctor attempts to sabotage the process. Controller escapes and turns on the group. After it murders Kaftan, Toberman breaks free of the Cybermen's conditioning and disables it. While he, the Doctor, and Jamie return to refreeze the tombs, Klieg, unable to accept that the Cybermen will not forge an alliance, tries to stop them, only to be murdered by a Cyberman. After Toberman destroys it, the Doctor activates the tombs, hoping that the Cybermen will stay there for good.

The Doctor reseals the tombs and sets up counter measures to ensure the Cybermen will not be revived again. After resetting the defenses, he discovers the Controller is still functional and flees, working with the survivors to close it into the tombs. Whilst the others struggle to keep the Controller inside, Toberman sacrifices himself to close the doors, completing the circuit, and electrocuting both him and the Controller. With the rocket repaired, the expedition leaves, the Doctor and his companions bidding them goodbye. As they leave, they fail to spot a surviving Cybermat, which approaches Toberman's body.

Production

Writing
Peter Bryant, who had previously been assistant to Gerry Davis and been newly promoted to script editor on the preceding story, was allowed to produce this serial in order to prove that he could take over from Innes Lloyd as producer later on in the season. Bryant's own assistant, Victor Pemberton, acted as script editor on this serial, but left the series after production of the serial was finished, deciding that he didn't want to be a script editor. When Bryant's eventual promotion to producer came, Derrick Sherwin became script editor. The working titles for this story were The Ice Tombs of Telos and The Cybermen Planet.

Toberman was originally intended to be deaf, hence his lack of significant speech; his hearing aid would foreshadow his transformation into a Cyberman.

Recording
It was produced at the end of the fourth recording block but was deliberately held back to season 5, despite the fact a 'Next Week' caption was prepared for the final episode of The Evil of the Daleks, suggesting it was originally intended to end the fourth season.

The exterior scenes for Telos were recorded at Gerrards Cross Sand and Gravel Quarry.

The Cybermats were controlled by various means – by wires, by wind-up clockwork, by radio-control, and some by simply being shoved into the shot. When the team were not filming, it was known for the people controlling the radio-controlled Cybermats to chase Deborah Watling around on set. The scene of the Cybermen breaking out of their tombs was filmed entirely in one take.

In the scene where the group are at the main entrance of the tomb, Patrick Troughton and Frazer Hines worked out in secret the brief sequence where both the Doctor and Jamie go to take Victoria by the hand and end up taking each others. They knew that, with the recording schedule and the likelihood that re-takes would not be possible, it would have to be left in.

Broadcast, archive and reception

On 24 February 2013, the episode aired in the United States on BBC America as part of a year-long celebration and acknowledgement of the 50th anniversary of Doctor Who. Prior to the episode's airing that evening, a short documentary was aired which featured interviews with former, current and original Doctor Who production staff who shared their memories and perspectives of Patrick Troughton. It also appeared on Australian Broadcasting Corporation's iView exclusively, part of their celebration for Doctor Who's 50th anniversary.

Reception
Following the transmission of the first episode, the BBC's Head of Drama Sydney Newman personally congratulated Peter Bryant on what he had seen, which Bryant later recalled: "Coming from the man who created Doctor Who that was the ultimate compliment, even more so seeing as it was my first job as producer." However, the serial also attracted controversy. On 26 September 1967, Kit Pedler appeared on the BBC series Talkback, hosted by David Coleman, to defend the serial against parents who thought it was too violent.

Paul Cornell, Martin Day, and Keith Topping wrote favourably of the serial in The Discontinuity Guide (1995), despite some criticism, "The first two episodes are wonderful, a well directed and expensive looking restating of the series' basics, but once the Cybermen are released from the Tombs, they go back in again." In The Television Companion (1998), David J. Howe and Stephen James Walker stated that it was similar to previous Cybermen stories, but "manages to develop the idea to greater advantage and, as a result, achieves a considerable success" and was "well-paced, gripping and, in places, genuinely frightening". They praised the Cybermen, but said the noise they made while being attacked was "silly", and also criticised some of the direction and Deborah Watling's Victoria, whom they felt was an inconsistent character.

In 2009, Mark Braxton of Radio Times wrote that the story "does deserve its reputation" as a classic. DVD Talk's J. Doyle Wallis, in a review of the original DVD release, gave the serial three and a half out of five stars and called it "a very entertaining story". In a review of the special edition DVD for the same website, John Sinnott gave The Tomb of the Cybermen four stars. Sinnot praised Troughton's performance and the subtlety of the guest acting. Reviewing the serial for The Independent in 2012, Neela Debnath praised the "impressive production values" and faster pace. Christopher Bahn of The A.V. Club was less positive. He said that the story's "flaws are awfully apparent today" due to the "huge gaps in story logic and some really unfortunate racial stereotyping". Bahn was positive towards Troughton and the plot's buildup, but felt that the rest "just kind of peters out" and the villains' motivations were "convoluted".

In 2010, Charlie Jane Anders of io9 listed the cliffhanger to the second episode – in which the Cybermen break out of their tombs – as one of the greatest cliffhangers in the history of Doctor Who.

Archive
When the BBC's film archive was first properly audited in 1978, it was one of many believed missing (although it is absent in earlier 1976 listings). It was prepared for release in early 1992 on audio cassette as part of the "Missing Stories" collection, using recordings made by fans at home at the time of transmission, with newly recorded explanatory narration by Jon Pertwee. Then in late 1991, telerecordings of all four episodes were returned to the BBC from the Hong Kong-based Rediffusion company. In May 1992, it was released on VHS with a special introduction from director Morris Barry. The VHS release topped the sales charts throughout the country. This was the only Doctor Who story from the original era to top the UK charts.

Between 1991 and 2013, it was believed to be the only complete story from Season 5 (and the only complete serial to feature Deborah Watling) before the complete run of The Enemy of the World was returned from Nigeria in 2013.

Commercial releases

In print

Gerry Davis novelisation was published by Target Books in 1978, entitled Doctor Who and The Tomb of the Cybermen; an audio reading of the novelisation, read by Michael Kilgarriff, was released in March 2013.

A transcript of the transmitted version of the serial, edited by John McElroy, was published by Titan Books in August 1989. It was the second in that publisher's series of Doctor Who script books, following The Tribe of Gum. There was no video copy of The Tomb of the Cybermen in the BBC archives at the time that the book was prepared.

Home media

With the recovery of the film prints, the planned soundtrack release was delayed until 1993, when contractual obligations forced its release. See List of Doctor Who audio releases.

Following the 1993 cassette release, on 1 May 2006 the soundtrack was released on a 2-CD set with linking narration by and a bonus interview with Frazer Hines. This was the first existing story to be released on audio in the same format as the missing story range.

A vinyl release of the soundtrack was released in 2018 exclusively for Record Store Day.

In the UK the DVD was released 13 January 2002. This was the first black and white story to be released on this format. This serial was also released as part of the Doctor Who DVD Files in issue 73 on 19 October 2011. A special edition of the DVD, with new bonus features and the entire story now treated with the VidFIRE process was released in the UK on 13 February 2012 in the third of the Revisitations DVD box sets.

In 2013 it was released on DVD again as part of the "Doctor Who: The Doctors Revisited 1–4" box set, alongside The Aztecs, Spearhead from Space and Pyramids of Mars. Alongside a documentary on the Second Doctor, the disc features the serial put together as a single feature in widescreen format with an introduction from former show runner Steven Moffat, as well as its original version. It was then released again (the same VidFIRE restored version), included in a set paired with Rise of the Cybermen and The Age of Steel (a two-part Tenth Doctor David Tennant story from 2006), in 2013's "The Monster Collection" series, specifically "The Cybermen" entry.

Music release

Stock music and sound effects from this story was released on a "mini-album" by Via Satellite in 1997. It had 2 versions of the Doctor Who theme music, sound effects from Doctor Who: 30 Years at the BBC Radiophonic Workshop, and an incomplete selection of stock music used in the story. It was planned to be the first in a series of mini-albums, with The Faceless Ones and Inside the Spaceship being mooted as future albums. Neither was produced.

Library tracks used in The Tomb of the Cybermen but missing from this CD include Univers Sidéral by Paul Bonneau, assorted Synchro-Stings by Trevor Duncan, Sting Tintabuloid 1 by Desmond Leslie, Eerie Vaults by Steve Race, Suspended Animation, Galaxy and Hypnosis by Eric Siday, Dramatic Brass Chords by Wolf Droysen, and from Frank Talley's Off Center Suite: Dark Pursuit, Off Center and Panic in the Streets.

Although the CD inlay lists only 11 tracks, the actual disc contains 12. This was caused by the Astronautics Suite being divided into two tracks. The table below details the actual tracks as they appear on the CD rather than as listed on the inlay.

Track listing

Other Music Releases
Music cues from this story have been made available on other releases over the years. Several can be found on the Space Adventures – Music from 'Doctor Who' 1963–1968 CD. Other sources are listed below.

References

Bibliography

External links

Doctor Who Locations – The Tomb of the Cybermen

Target novelisation

On Target – Doctor Who and the Tomb of the Cybermen

1967 British television episodes
Cybermen television stories
Doctor Who serials novelised by Gerry Davis
Second Doctor serials
Fiction set in the 25th century
Rediscovered television